Kaleemullah Khan (also spelled Kalimulla; born 2 January 1958 in Bahawalpur is a field hockey player from Pakistan. His brother Samiullah Khan, is also an award-winning hockey player.

A forward, Kaleemullah played between 1979 and 1986, he was capped 176 times with 97 goals. He won the Gold medal at the 1984 Summer Olympics. He scored the winning goal in 1984 Olympics final in extra time. He was member of Pakistan Hockey team that won Gold in 1982 World cup and Asian Games respectively, wherein he scored goals in the finals.

Awards and recognition
Kaleemullah Khan received the Pride of Performance Award by the President of Pakistan in 1984.

See also
 Pakistan Hockey Federation

References

External links
 

1958 births
Living people
Olympic field hockey players of Pakistan
Pakistani male field hockey players
Field hockey players at the 1984 Summer Olympics
Olympic gold medalists for Pakistan
Recipients of the Pride of Performance
Medalists at the 1984 Summer Olympics
Asian Games gold medalists for Pakistan
Asian Games silver medalists for Pakistan
Medalists at the 1982 Asian Games
Medalists at the 1986 Asian Games
Asian Games medalists in field hockey
Field hockey players at the 1982 Asian Games
Field hockey players at the 1986 Asian Games
Olympic medalists in field hockey